KIKZ (1250 AM) is a radio station licensed to Seminole, Texas. The station broadcasts an adult contemporary format and is owned by Gaines County Broadcasting, Ltd.

References

External links
KIKZ's official website

IKZ
Mainstream adult contemporary radio stations in the United States